I Know Why the Caged Bird Sings is a 1969 autobiography describing the young and early years of American writer and poet Maya Angelou. The first in a seven-volume series, it is a coming-of-age story that illustrates how strength of character and a love of literature can help overcome racism and trauma. The book begins when three-year-old Maya and her older brother are sent to Stamps, Arkansas, to live with their grandmother and ends when Maya becomes a mother at the age of 16. In the course of Caged Bird, Maya transforms from a victim of racism with an inferiority complex into a self-possessed, dignified young woman capable of responding to prejudice.

Angelou was challenged by her friend, author James Baldwin, and her editor, Robert Loomis, to write an autobiography that was also a piece of literature. Reviewers often categorize Caged Bird as autobiographical fiction because Angelou uses thematic development and other techniques common to fiction, but the prevailing critical view characterizes it as an autobiography, a genre she attempts to critique, change, and expand. The book covers topics common to autobiographies written by black American women in the years following the Civil Rights Movement: a celebration of black motherhood; a critique of racism; the importance of family; and the quest for independence, personal dignity, and self-definition.

Angelou uses her autobiography to explore subjects such as identity, rape, racism, and literacy. She also writes in new ways about women's lives in a male-dominated society. Maya, the younger version of Angelou and the book's central character, has been called "a symbolic character for every black girl growing up in America". Angelou's description of being raped as an eight-year-old child overwhelms the book, although it is presented briefly in the text. Another metaphor, that of a bird struggling to escape its cage, is a central image throughout the work, which consists of "a sequence of lessons about resisting racist oppression". Angelou's treatment of racism provides a thematic unity to the book. Literacy and the power of words help young Maya cope with her bewildering world; books become her refuge as she works through her trauma.

Caged Bird was nominated for a National Book Award in 1970 and remained on The New York Times paperback bestseller list for two years. It has been used in educational settings from high schools to universities, and the book has been celebrated for creating new literary avenues for the American memoir. However, the book's graphic depiction of childhood rape, racism, and sexuality has caused it to be challenged or banned in some schools and libraries.

Background

Before writing I Know Why the Caged Bird Sings at the age of forty, Angelou had a long and varied career, holding jobs such as composer, singer, actor, civil rights worker, journalist, and educator. In the late 1950s, she joined the Harlem Writers Guild, where she met a number of important African-American authors, including her friend and mentor James Baldwin. After hearing civil rights leader Martin Luther King Jr. speak for the first time in 1960, she was inspired to join the Civil Rights Movement. She organized several benefits for him, and he named her Northern Coordinator of the Southern Christian Leadership Conference. She worked for several years in Ghana, West Africa, as a journalist, actress, and educator. She was invited back to the US by Malcolm X to work for him shortly before his assassination in 1965. In 1968, King asked her to organize a march, but he too was assassinated on April 4, which also happened to be her birthday. For many years, Angelou responded to King's murder by not celebrating her birthday, instead choosing to meet with, call, or send flowers to his widow, Coretta Scott King.

Angelou was deeply depressed in the months following King's assassination, so to help lift her spirits, Baldwin brought her to a dinner party at the home of cartoonist Jules Feiffer and his wife Judy in late 1968. The guests began telling stories of their childhoods and Angelou's stories impressed Judy Feiffer. The next day she called Robert Loomis at Random House, who became Angelou's editor throughout her long writing career until he retired in 2011, and "told him that he ought to get this woman to write a book". At first, Angelou refused, since she thought of herself as a poet and playwright. According to Angelou, Baldwin had a "covert hand" in getting her to write the book, and advised Loomis to use "a little reverse psychology", and reported that Loomis tricked her into it by daring her: "It's just as well", he said, "because to write an autobiography as literature is just about impossible". Angelou was unable to resist a challenge, and she began writing Caged Bird. After "closeting herself" in London it took her two years to write it. She shared the manuscript with her friend writer Jessica Mitford before submitting it for publication.

Angelou subsequently wrote six additional autobiographies, covering a variety of her young adult experiences. They are distinct in style and narration, but unified in their themes, and stretch from Arkansas to Africa, and back to the US, from the beginnings of World War II to King's assassination. Like Caged Bird, the events in these books are episodic and crafted as a series of short stories, yet do not follow a strict chronology. Later books in the series include Gather Together in My Name (1974), Singin' and Swingin' and Gettin' Merry Like Christmas (1976), The Heart of a Woman (1981), All God's Children Need Traveling Shoes (1986), A Song Flung Up to Heaven (2002), and mother & Me & mother (2013, at the age of 85). Critics have often judged Angelou's later autobiographies "in light of the first", and Caged Bird generally receives the highest praise.

Beginning with Caged Bird, Angelou used the same "writing ritual" for many years. She would get up at five in the morning and check into a hotel room, where the staff were instructed to remove any pictures from the walls. She wrote on yellow legal pads while lying on the bed, with a bottle of sherry, a deck of cards to play solitaire, Roget's Thesaurus, and the Bible, and left by the early afternoon. She averaged 10–12 pages of material a day, which she edited down to three or four pages in the evening. Lupton stated that this ritual indicated "a firmness of purpose and an inflexible use of time". Angelou went through this process to give herself time to turn the events of her life into art, and to "enchant" herself; as she said in a 1989 interview with the BBC, to "relive the agony, the anguish, the Sturm und Drang". She placed herself back in the time she wrote about, even during traumatic experiences like her rape in Caged Bird, to "tell the human truth" about her life. Critic Opal Moore says about Caged Bird: "...Though easily read, [it] is no 'easy read'". Angelou stated that she played cards to reach that place of enchantment, to access her memories more effectively. She has stated, "It may take an hour to get into it, but once I'm in it—ha! It's so delicious!" She did not find the process cathartic; rather, she found relief in "telling the truth".

Title
When selecting a title, Angelou turned to Paul Laurence Dunbar, an African American poet whose works she had admired for years. Jazz vocalist and civil rights activist Abbey Lincoln suggested the title.  According to Lyman B. Hagen, the title pulls Angelou's readers into the book while reminding them that it is possible to both lose control of one's life and to have one's freedom taken from them. Angelou has credited Dunbar, along with Shakespeare, with forming her "writing ambition". The title of the book comes from the third stanza of Dunbar's poem "Sympathy":

I know why the caged bird sings, ah me,When his wing is bruised and his bosom sore,When he beats his bars and would be free;It is not a carol of joy or glee,But a prayer that he sends from his heart's deep core,But a plea, that upward to Heaven he flings – I know why the caged bird sings.

Plot summary

I Know Why the Caged Bird Sings follows Marguerite's (called "My" or "Maya" by her brother) life from the age of three to seventeen and the struggles she faces – particularly with racism and self affirmation – in the Southern United States. Abandoned by their parents, Maya and her older brother Bailey are sent to live with their paternal grandmother (Momma) and disabled uncle (Uncle Willie) in Stamps, Arkansas. Maya and Bailey are haunted by their parents' abandonment throughout the book – they travel alone, are labeled like baggage, and later accepted in the community.

Many of the problems Maya encounters in her childhood stem from the overt racism of her white neighbors and the subliminal awareness of race relations weaved in society. Although Momma is relatively wealthy because she owns the general store at the heart of Stamps' Black community, the white children of their town hassle Maya's family relentlessly. One of these "powhitetrash" girls, for example, reveals her pubic hair to Momma in a humiliating incident which leaves Maya, watching from a distance, indignant and furious. Early in the book, Momma hides Uncle Willie in a vegetable bin to protect him from Ku Klux Klan raiders, where he moans and groans under the potatoes throughout the night. Maya has to endure the insult of her name being changed to Mary by a racist employer. A white speaker at her eighth grade graduation ceremony disparages the Black audience by suggesting that they have limited job opportunities. A white dentist refuses to treat Maya's rotting tooth, even when Momma reminds him that she had loaned him money during the Depression. The Black community of Stamps enjoys a moment of racial victory when they listen to the radio broadcast of Joe Louis's championship fight, but generally, they feel the heavy weight of racist oppression.

A turning point in the book occurs when Maya and Bailey's father unexpectedly appears in Stamps. He takes the two children with him when he departs, but leaves them with their mother in St. Louis, Missouri. Eight-year-old Maya is sexually abused and raped by her mother's boyfriend, Mr. Freeman. He is found guilty during the trial, but escapes jail time and is murdered, presumably by Maya's uncles. Maya feels guilty and withdraws from everyone but her brother. Even after returning to Stamps, Maya remains reclusive and nearly mute until she meets Mrs. Bertha Flowers, "the aristocrat of Black Stamps," who encourages her through books and communication to regain her voice and soul. This coaxes Maya out of her shell.

Later, Momma decides to send her grandchildren to their mother in San Francisco, California, to protect them from the dangers of racism in Stamps. Maya attends George Washington High School and studies dance and drama on a scholarship at the California Labor School. Before graduating, she becomes the first Black female cable car conductor in San Francisco. While still in high school, Maya visits her father in southern California one summer and has some experiences pivotal to her development. She drives a car for the first time when she must transport her intoxicated father home from an excursion to Mexico. She experiences homelessness for a short time after a fight with her father's girlfriend.

During Maya's final year of high school, she worries that she might be a lesbian (which she confuses due to her sexual inexperience with the belief that lesbians are also hermaphrodites).  She ultimately initiates sexual intercourse with a teenage boy. She becomes pregnant, which on the advice of her brother, she hides from her family until her eighth month of pregnancy in order to graduate from high school. Maya gives birth at the end of the book.

Style and genre

Angelou's prose works, while presenting a unique interpretation of the autobiographical form, can be placed in the long tradition of African-American autobiography.  Her use of fiction-writing techniques such as dialogue, characterization, and thematic development, however, often lead reviewers to categorize her books, including I Know Why the Caged Bird Sings, as autobiographical fiction. Other critics, like Lupton, insist that Angelou's books should be categorized as autobiographies because they conform to the genre's standard structure: they are written by a single author, they are chronological, and they contain elements of character, technique, and theme. In a 1983 interview with African-American literature critic Claudia Tate, Angelou calls her books autobiographies.

At first, Angelou intended to return to poetry and play-writing after completing Caged Bird and write no more autobiographies, but she chose the genre as her primary mode of expression because of its challenge and so that she could "change it, to make it bigger, richer, finer, and more inclusive in the twentieth century". In a 1989 interview, she stated, "I think I am the only serious writer who has chosen the autobiographical form to carry my work, my expression".  As she told journalist George Plimpton during a 1990 interview, "Autobiography is awfully seductive; it’s wonderful".  She also told Plimpton that like the tradition begun by Frederick Douglass in slave narratives, she used the literary technique of "speaking in the first-person singular talking about the first-person plural, always saying I meaning 'we'".  As critic Susan Gilbert states, Angelou was reporting not one person's story, but the collective's.  Scholar Selwyn R. Cudjoe agrees, and sees Angelou as representative of the convention in African-American autobiography as a public gesture that speaks for an entire group of people.

Scholar Joanne M. Braxton sees Caged Bird as "the fully developed black female autobiographical form that began to emerge in the 1940s and 1950s".  The book presents themes that are common in autobiography by Black American women: a celebration of Black motherhood; a criticism of racism; the importance of family; and the quest for independence, personal dignity, and self-definition. Angelou introduces a unique point of view in American autobiography by revealing her life story through a narrator who is a Black female from the South, at some points a child, and other points a mother. Writer Hilton Als calls Angelou one of the "pioneers of self-exposure", willing to focus honestly on the more negative aspects of her personality and choices. For example, Angelou was worried about her readers' reactions to her disclosure in her second autobiography, Gather Together in My Name, that she was a prostitute.  She went through with it, anyway, after her husband Paul Du Feu advised her to be honest about it.

Angelou has recognized that there are fictional aspects to her books, and that she tends to "diverge from the conventional notion of autobiography as truth".  Angelou discussed her writing process with Plimpton, and when asked if she changed the truth to improve her story, she admitted that she had.  She stated, "Sometimes I make a diameter from a composite of three or four people, because the essence in only one person is not sufficiently strong to be written about." Although Angelou has never admitted to changing the facts in her stories, she has used these facts to make an impact with the reader. As Hagen states, "One can assume that 'the essence of the data' is present in Angelou's work". Hagen also states that Angelou "fictionalizes, to enhance interest".  For example, Angelou uses the first-person narrative voice customary with autobiographies, told from the perspective of a child that is "artfully recreated by an adult narrator".

Angelou uses two distinct voices, the adult writer and the child who is the focus of the book, whom Angelou calls "the Maya character". Angelou reports that maintaining the distinction between herself and the Maya character is "damned difficult", but "very necessary". Scholar Liliane Arensberg suggests that Angelou "retaliates for the tongue-tied child's helpless pain" by using her adult self's irony and wit.  As such, Caged Bird has been called a Bildungsroman or coming-of-age story; critic Mary Jane Lupton compares it to other Bildungsromans like George Eliot's novel The Mill on the Floss. According to Lupton, the two books share the following similarities: a focus on young strong-willed heroines who have solid relationships with their brothers, an examination of the role of literature in life, and an emphasis on the importance of family and community life.

Form
When Angelou wrote I Know Why the Caged Bird Sings at the end of the 1960s,  one of the necessary and accepted features of literature, according to critic Pierre A. Walker, was thematic unity.  One of Angelou's goals was to create a book that satisfied this criterion, in order to achieve her political purposes, which were to demonstrate how to resist racism in America. The structure of the text, which resembles a series of short stories, is not chronological but rather thematic. Walker, in his 1993 article about Caged Bird, "Racial Protest, Identity, Words, and Form", focuses on the book's structure, and describes how it supports her presentation of racism.  According to Walker, critics had neglected analyzing its structure, choosing to focus instead on its themes, which he feels neglects the political nature of the book.  He states, "One serves Angelou and Caged Bird better by emphasizing how form and political content work together".  Angelou structures her book so that it presents a series of lessons about how to resist racism and oppression.  The progression Maya goes through thematically unifies the book, something that "stands in contrast to the otherwise episodic quality of the narrative".  The way in which Angelou constructs, arranges, and organizes her vignettes often undermined the chronology of her childhood by "juxtaposing the events of one chapter with the events of preceding and following ones so that they too comment on each other".

For example, the incident with the "powhitetrash" girls takes place in chapter 5, when Maya was ten years old, well before Angelou's recounting of her rape in chapter 12, which occurred when Maya was 8.  Walker explains that Angelou's purpose in placing the vignettes in this way is that it followed her thematic structure.  Angelou's editor, Robert Loomis, agrees, stating that Angelou could rewrite any of her books by changing the order of her facts to make a different impact on the reader.  Hagen sees Angelou's structure somewhat differently, focusing on Maya's journey "to establish a worthwhile self-concept", and states that she structures the book into three parts: arrival, sojourn, and departure, which occur both geographically and psychologically.  However, Hagen notes that instead of beginning Caged Bird chronologically, with Maya and Bailey's arrival in Stamps, Angelou begins the book much later chronologically by recounting an embarrassing experience at church, an incident that demonstrates Maya's diminished sense of self, insecurity, and lack of status.  Hagen explains that Angelou's purpose is to demonstrate Maya's journey from insecurity to her feelings of worth gained by becoming a mother at the end of the book.

Themes

Identity

In the course of Caged Bird, Maya, who has been described as "a symbolic character for every black girl growing up in America", goes from being a victim of racism with an inferiority complex to a self-aware individual who responds to racism with dignity and a strong sense of her own identity. Feminist scholar Maria Lauret states that the "formation of female cultural identity" is woven into the book's narrative, setting Maya up as "a role model for Black women".  Scholar Liliane Arensberg calls this presentation Angelou's "identity theme" and a major motif in Angelou's narrative.  Maya's unsettled life in Caged Bird suggests her sense of self "as perpetually in the process of becoming, of dying and being reborn, in all its ramifications". African-American literature scholar Dolly McPherson agrees, stating that Angelou creatively uses Christian mythology and theology to present the Biblical themes of death, regeneration, and rebirth.

As Lauret indicates, Angelou and other female writers in the late 1960s and early 1970s used autobiography to reimagine ways of writing about women's lives and identities in a male-dominated society. Up until this time, Black women were not depicted realistically in African-American fiction and autobiography, meaning that Angelou was one of the first Black autobiographers to present, as Cudjoe put it, "a powerful and authentic signification of [African-American] womanhood in her quest for understanding and love rather than for bitterness and despair". Lauret sees a connection between Angelou's autobiographies, which Lauret calls "fictions of subjectivity" and "feminist first-person narratives", and fictional first-person narratives (such as The Women's Room by Marilyn French and The Golden Notebook by Doris Lessing) written during the same period.  As French and Lessing do in their novels, Angelou employs the narrator as protagonist and depends upon "the illusion of presence in their mode of signification".

As a displaced girl, Maya's pain is worsened by an awareness of her displacement.  She is "the forgotten child", and must come to terms with "the unimaginable reality" of being unloved and unwanted; she lives in a hostile world that defines beauty in terms of whiteness and that rejects her simply because she is a Black girl. Maya internalizes the rejection she has experienced – her belief in her own ugliness was "absolute". McPherson believes that the concept of family, or what she calls "kinship concerns", in Angelou's books must be understood in the light of the children's displacement at the beginning of Caged Bird. Being sent away from their parents was a psychological rejection, and resulted in a quest for love, acceptance, and self-worth for both Maya and Bailey.

Angelou uses her many roles, incarnations, and identities throughout her books to illustrate how oppression and personal history are interrelated. For example, in Caged Bird, Angelou demonstrates the "racist habit" of renaming African Americans, as shown when her white employer insists on calling her "Mary".  Angelou describes the employer's renaming as the "hellish horror of being 'called out of [one's] name'".  Scholar Debra Walker King calls it a racist insult and an assault against Maya's race and self-image. The renaming emphasizes Maya's feelings of inadequacy and denigrates her identity, individuality, and uniqueness. Maya understands that she is being insulted and rebels by breaking Mrs. Cullinan's favorite dish, but feels vindicated when, as she leaves her employer's home, Mrs. Cullinan finally gets her name right. Another incident in the book that solidifies Maya's identity is her trip to Mexico with her father, when she has to drive a car for the first time. Contrasted with her experience in Stamps, Maya is finally "in control of her fate".  This experience is central to Maya's growth, as is the incident that immediately follows it, her short period of homelessness after arguing with her father's girlfriend. These two incidents give Maya a knowledge of self-determination and confirm her self-worth.

Scholar Mary Burgher believes that female Black autobiographers like Angelou have debunked the stereotypes of African-American mothers as "breeder[s] and matriarch[s]", and have presented them as having "a creative and personally fulfilling role". Lupton believes that Angelou's plot construction and character development were influenced by the same mother/child motif as is found in the work of Harlem Renaissance poet Jessie Fauset. For the first five years of her life, Maya thinks of herself as an orphan and finds comfort in the thought that her mother is dead.  Maya's feelings for and relationship with her own mother, whom she blames for her abandonment, express themselves in ambivalence and "repressed violent aggression". For example, Maya and her brother destroy the first Christmas gifts sent by their mother. These strong feelings are not resolved until the end of the book, when Maya becomes a mother herself, and her mother finally becomes the nurturing presence for which Maya has longed. The two main maternal influences on Maya's life change as well; Vivian becomes a more active participant, while Momma becomes less effective as Maya, by becoming a mother herself, moves from childhood to adulthood.

Racism

Stamps, Arkansas, as depicted in Caged Bird, has very little "social ambiguity": it is a racist world divided between Black and white, male and female.  Als characterizes the division as "good and evil", and notes how Angelou's witness of the evil in her society, which was directed at Black women, shaped Angelou's young life and informed her views into adulthood. Angelou uses the metaphor of a bird struggling to escape its cage, described in Paul Laurence Dunbar's poem, as a prominent symbol throughout her series of autobiographies. Like elements within a prison narrative, the caged bird represents Angelou's confinement resulting from racism and oppression. The caged bird metaphor also invokes the "supposed contradiction of the bird singing in the midst of its struggle". Scholar Ernece B. Kelley calls Caged Bird a "gentle indictment of white American womanhood"; Hagen expands it further, stating that the book is "a dismaying story of white dominance".

Caged Bird has been called "perhaps the most aesthetically satisfying autobiography written in the years immediately following the Civil Rights era". Critic Pierre A. Walker expresses a similar sentiment, and places it in the African-American literature tradition of political protest. Angelou demonstrates, through her involvement with the Black community of Stamps, as well as her presentation of vivid and realistic racist characters and "the vulgarity of white Southern attitudes toward African Americans", her developing understanding of the rules for surviving in a racist society. Angelou's autobiographies, beginning with Caged Bird, contain a sequence of lessons about resisting oppression.  The sequence she describes leads Angelou, as the protagonist, from "helpless rage and indignation to forms of subtle resistance, and finally to outright and active protest".

Walker insists that Angelou's treatment of racism is what gives her autobiographies their thematic unity and underscores one of their central themes: the injustice of racism and how to fight it. For example, in Angelou's depiction of the "powhitetrash" incident, Maya reacts with rage, indignation, humiliation, and helplessness, but Momma teaches her how they can maintain their personal dignity and pride while dealing with racism, and that it is an effective basis for actively protesting and combating racism. Walker calls Momma's way a "strategy of subtle resistance" and McPherson calls it "the dignified course of silent endurance".

Angelou portrays Momma as a realist whose patience, courage, and silence ensured the survival and success of those who came after her. For example, Maya responds assertively when subjected to demeaning treatment by Mrs. Cullinan, her white employer, and, later on in the book, breaks the race barrier to become the first black streetcar operator in San Francisco. In addition, Angelou's description of the strong and cohesive black community of Stamps demonstrates how African Americans subvert repressive institutions to withstand racism. Arensberg insists that Angelou demonstrates how she, as a Black child, evolves out of her "racial hatred", common in the works of many contemporary Black novelists and autobiographers. At first Maya wishes that she could become white, since growing up Black in white America is dangerous; later she sheds her self-loathing and embraces a strong racial identity.

Rape

Angelou's description of being raped as an eight-year-old child overwhelms the autobiography, although it is presented briefly in the text. Scholar Mary Vermillion compares Angelou's treatment of rape to that of Harriet Jacobs in her autobiography Incidents in the Life of a Slave Girl. Jacobs and Angelou both use rape as a metaphor for the suffering of African Americans; Jacobs uses the metaphor to critique slaveholding culture, while Angelou uses it to first internalize, then challenge, twentieth-century racist conceptions of the Black female body (namely, that the Black female is physically unattractive). Rape, according to Vermillion, "represents the black girl's difficulties in controlling, understanding, and respecting both her body and her words".

Arensberg notes that Maya's rape is connected to the theme of death in Caged Bird, as Mr. Freeman threatens to kill Maya's brother Bailey if she tells anyone about the rape. After Maya lies during Freeman's trial, stating that the rape was the first time he touched her inappropriately, Freeman is murdered (presumably by one of Maya's uncles) and Maya sees her words as a bringer of death. As a result, she resolves never to speak to anyone other than Bailey. Angelou connects the violation of her body and the devaluation of her words through the depiction of her self-imposed, five-year-long silence. As Angelou later stated, "I thought if I spoke, my mouth would just issue out something that would kill people, randomly, so it was better not to talk".

African-American literature scholar Selwyn R. Cudjoe calls Angelou's depiction of the rape "a burden" of Caged Bird: a demonstration of "the manner in which the Black female is violated in her tender years and ... the 'unnecessary insult' of Southern girlhood in her movement to adolescence". Vermillion goes further, maintaining that a Black woman who writes about her rape risks reinforcing negative stereotypes about her race and gender. When asked decades later how she was able to survive such trauma, Angelou explained it by stating, "I can't remember a time when I wasn't loved by somebody." When asked by the same interviewer why she wrote about the experience, she indicated that she wanted to demonstrate the complexities of rape.  She also wanted to prevent it from happening to someone else, so that anyone who had been raped might gain understanding and not blame herself for it.

Literacy

As Lupton points out, all of Angelou's autobiographies, especially Caged Bird and its immediate sequel Gather Together in My Name, are "very much concerned with what [Angelou] knew and how she learned it". Lupton compares Angelou's informal education with the education of other Black writers of the twentieth century, who did not earn official degrees and depended upon the "direct instruction of African American cultural forms". Angelou's quest for learning and literacy parallels "the central myth of black culture in America": that freedom and literacy are connected. Angelou is influenced by writers introduced to her by Mrs. Flowers during her self-imposed muteness, including Edgar Allan Poe and William Shakespeare. Angelou states, early in Caged Bird, that she, as the Maya character, "met and fell in love with William Shakespeare". Critic Mary Vermillion sees a connection between Maya's rape and Shakespeare's "The Rape of Lucrece", which Maya memorizes and recites when she regains her speech.  Vermillion maintains that Maya finds comfort in the poem's identification with suffering. Maya finds novels and their characters complete and meaningful, so she uses them to make sense of her bewildering world. She is so involved in her fantasy world of books that she even uses them as a way to cope with her rape, writing in Caged Bird, "...I was sure that any minute my mother or Bailey or the Green Hornet would bust in the door and save me".

According to Walker, the power of words is another theme that appears repeatedly in Caged Bird. For example, Maya chooses to not speak after her rape because she is afraid of the destructive power of words. Mrs. Flowers, by introducing her to classic literature and poetry, teaches her about the positive power of language and empowers Maya to speak again.  The importance of both the spoken and written word also appears repeatedly in Caged Bird and in all of Angelou's autobiographies. Referring to the importance of literacy and methods of effective writing, Angelou once advised Oprah Winfrey in a 1993 interview to "do as West Africans do ... listen to the deep talk", or the "utterances existing beneath the obvious". McPherson says, "If there is one stable element in Angelou's youth it is [a] dependence upon books". The public library is a "quiet refuge" to which Maya retreats when she experiences crisis. Hagen describes Angelou as a "natural story-teller", which "reflect[s] a good listener with a rich oral heritage". Hagen also insists that Angelou's years of muteness provided her with this skill.

Angelou was also powerfully affected by slave narratives, spirituals, poetry, and other autobiographies. Angelou read through the Bible twice as a young child, and memorized many passages from it. African-American spirituality, as represented by Angelou's grandmother, has influenced all of Angelou's writings, in the activities of the church community she first experiences in Stamps, in the sermonizing, and in scripture. Hagen goes on to say that in addition to being influenced by rich literary form, Angelou has also been influenced by oral traditions. In Caged Bird, Mrs. Flowers encourages her to listen carefully to "Mother Wit", which Hagen defines as the collective wisdom of the African-American community as expressed in folklore and humor.

Angelou's humor in Caged Bird and in all her autobiographies is drawn from Black folklore and is used to demonstrate that in spite of severe racism and oppression, Black people thrive and are, as Hagen states, "a community of song and laughter and courage". Hagen states that Angelou is able to make an indictment of institutionalized racism as she laughs at her flaws and the flaws of her community and "balances stories of black endurance of oppression against white myths and misperceptions". Hagen also characterize Caged Bird as a "blues genre autobiography" because it uses elements of blues music. These elements include the act of testimony when speaking of one's life and struggles, ironic understatement, and the use of natural metaphors, rhythms, and intonations. Hagen also sees elements of African American sermonizing in Caged Bird. Angelou's use of African-American oral traditions creates a sense of community in her readers, and identifies those who belong to it.

Reception and legacy

Critical reception and sales
I Know Why the Caged Bird Sings is the most highly acclaimed of Angelou's autobiographies. The other volumes in her series of seven autobiographies are judged and compared to Caged Bird. It became a bestseller immediately after it was published. Angelou's friend and mentor, James Baldwin, maintained that her book "liberates the reader into life" and called it "a Biblical study of life in the midst of death". According to Angelou's biographers, "Readers, especially women, and in particular Black women, took the book to heart".

By the end of 1969, critics had placed Angelou in the tradition of other Black autobiographers. Poet James Bertolino asserts that Caged Bird "is one of the essential books produced by our culture". He insists that "[w]e should all read it, especially our children". It was nominated for a National Book Award in 1970, has never been out of print, and has been published in many languages. It has been a Book of the Month Club selection and an Ebony Book Club selection. In 2011, Time Magazine placed the book in its list of 100 best and most influential books written in English since 1923.

Critic Robert A. Gross called Caged Bird "a tour de force of language".  Edmund Fuller insisted that Angelou's intellectual range and artistry were apparent in how she told her story. Caged Bird catapulted Angelou to international fame and critical acclaim, was a significant development in Black women's literature in that it "heralded the success of other now prominent writers". Other reviewers have praised Angelou's use of language in the book, including critic E. M. Guiney, who reported that Caged Bird was "one of the best autobiographies of its kind that I have read". Critic R. A. Gross praised Angelou for her use of rich and dazzling images.

By the mid-1980s, Caged Bird had gone through 20 hardback printings and 32 paperback printings. The week after Angelou recited her poem "On the Pulse of Morning" at President Bill Clinton's 1993 inauguration, sales of the paperback version of Caged Bird and her other works rose by 300–600 percent. Caged Bird had sold steadily since its publication, but it increased by 500 percent.  The 16-page publication of "On the Pulse of Morning" became a bestseller, and the recording of the poem was awarded a Grammy Award. The Bantam Books edition of Caged Bird was a bestseller for 36 weeks, and they had to reprint 400,000 copies of her books to meet demand. Random House, which published Angelou's hardcover books and the poem later that year, reported that they sold more of her books in January 1993 than they did in all of 1992, marking a 1,200 percent increase.

The book's reception has not been universally positive; for example, author Francine Prose considers its inclusion in the high school curriculum as partly responsible for the "dumbing down" of American society. Prose calls the book "manipulative melodrama", and considers Angelou's writing style an inferior example of poetic prose in memoir. She accuses Angelou of combining a dozen metaphors in one paragraph and for "obscuring ideas that could be expressed so much more simply and felicitously".  Many parents throughout the U.S. have sought to ban the book from schools and libraries for being inappropriate for younger high school students, for promoting premarital sex, homosexuality, cohabitation, and pornography, and for not supporting traditional values. Parents have also objected to the book's use of profanity and to its graphic and violent depiction of rape and racism.

Influence
When Caged Bird was published in 1969, Angelou was hailed as a new kind of memoirist, one of the first African-American women who was able to publicly discuss her personal life. Up to that point, Black women writers were marginalized to the point that they were unable to present themselves as central characters. Writer Julian Mayfield, who called Caged Bird "a work of art that eludes description", has insisted that Angelou's autobiographies set a precedent for African-American autobiography as a whole. Als insisted that Caged Bird marked one of the first times that a Black autobiographer could, as Als put it, "write about blackness from the inside, without apology or defense".  Through the writing of her autobiography, Angelou became recognized as a respected spokesperson for blacks and women. Caged Bird made her "without a doubt ... America's most visible black woman autobiographer". Although Als considers Caged Bird an important contribution to the increase of Black feminist writings in the 1970s, he attributes its success less to its originality than to "its resonance in the prevailing Zeitgeist" of its time, at the end of the American Civil Rights Movement. Angelou's writings, more interested in self-revelation than in politics or feminism, freed many other women writers to "open themselves up without shame to the eyes of the world".

Angelou's autobiographies, especially the first volume, have been used in narrative and multicultural approaches to teacher education. Jocelyn A. Glazier, a professor at George Washington University, has used Caged Bird and Gather Together in My Name when training teachers to appropriately explore racism in their classrooms. Angelou's use of understatement, self-mockery, humor, and irony causes readers of Angelou's autobiographies to wonder what she "left out" and to be unsure how to respond to the events Angelou describes. These techniques force white readers to explore their feelings about race and their privileged status in society. Glazier found that although critics have focused on where Angelou fits within the genre of African-American autobiography and her literary techniques, readers react to her storytelling with "surprise, particularly when [they] enter the text with certain expectations about the genre of autobiography".

Educator Daniel Challener, in his 1997 book Stories of Resilience in Childhood, analyzed the events in Caged Bird to illustrate resiliency in children. Challener states that Angelou's book provides a useful framework for exploring the obstacles many children like Maya face and how a community helps these children succeed as Angelou did. Psychologist Chris Boyatzis has used Caged Bird to supplement scientific theory and research in the instruction of child development topics such as the development of self-concept and self-esteem, ego resilience, industry versus inferiority, effects of abuse, parenting styles, sibling and friendship relations, gender issues, cognitive development, puberty, and identity formation in adolescence. He has called the book a highly effective tool for providing real-life examples of these psychological concepts.

Censorship

Caged Bird has been criticized by many parents, causing it to be removed from school curricula and library shelves. The book was approved to be taught in public schools and was placed in public school libraries through the U.S. in the early-1980s, and was included in advanced placement and gifted student curricula, but attempts by parents to censor it began in 1983.  It has been challenged in fifteen U.S. states. Educators have responded to these challenges by removing it from reading lists and libraries, by providing students with alternatives, and by requiring parental permission from students.  Some have been critical of its sexually explicit scenes, use of language, and irreverent religious depictions.

Caged Bird appeared third on the American Library Association (ALA) list of the 100 Most Frequently Challenged Books of 1990–2000, sixth on the ALA's 2000–2009 list, and one of the ten books most frequently banned from high school and junior high school libraries and classrooms.

Film version

A made-for-TV movie version of I Know Why the Caged Bird Sings was filmed in Mississippi and aired on April 28, 1979, on CBS.  Angelou and Leonora Thuna wrote the teleplay; the movie was directed by Fielder Cook. Constance Good played young Maya. Also appearing were actors Esther Rolle, Roger E. Mosley, Diahann Carroll, Ruby Dee, and Madge Sinclair.  Two scenes in the movie differed from events described in the book. Angelou added a scene between Maya and Uncle Willie after the Joe Louis fight; in it, he expresses his feelings of redemption and hope after Louis defeats a white opponent. Angelou also presents her eighth grade graduation differently in the film. In the book, Henry Reed delivers the valedictory speech and leads the Black audience in the Negro national anthem. In the movie, Maya conducts these activities.

Footnotes

Citations

Sources cited
 Angelou, Maya (1969). I Know Why the Caged Bird Sings.  New York: Random House. 
 Arensberg, Liliane K. (1999). "Death as Metaphor for Self". In Maya Angelou's I Know Why the Caged Bird Sings: A Casebook, Joanne M. Braxton, ed. New York: Oxford Press. 
 Baisnée, Valérie (1994). Gendered Resistance: The Autobiographies of Simone de Beauvoir, Maya Angelou, Janet Frame and Marguerite Duras. Amsterdam: Rodopi. 
 Bertolino, James (1996). "Maya Angelou is Three Writers". In Modern Critical Interpretations: Maya Angelou's I Know Why the Caged Bird Sings, Harold  Bloom, ed. New York: Chelsea House Publishers.  
 Bloom, Harold, ed. (2004). Maya Angelou's I Know Why the Caged Bird Sings.  New York: Chelsea House Publishers.  
 Bloom, Harold. "Summary and Analysis", pp. 18–51
 Smith, Sidonie Ann. "Angelou's Quest for Self-Acceptance", pp. 52–54
 Braxton, Joanne M. (2004).  "Black Autobiography", pp. 63–64
 Braxton, Joanne M., ed. (1999). Maya Angelou's I Know Why the Caged Bird Sings: A Casebook. New York: Oxford Press. 
 Braxton, Joanne M. "Symbolic Geography and Psychic Landscapes: A Conversation with Maya Angelou", pp. 3–20
 Moore, Opal. "Learning to Live: When the Bird Breaks from the Cage", pp. 49–58
 Vermillion, Mary. "Reembodying the Self: Representations of Rape in Incidents in the Life of a Slave Girl and I Know Why the Caged Bird Sings", pp. 59–76
 Tate, Claudia (1999). "Maya Angelou: An Interview", pp. 149–158
 Burgher, Mary (1979). "Images of Self and Race in the Autobiographies of Black Women". In Sturdy Black Bridges, Roseann P. Bell, et al., ed.  Garden City, N.Y.: Doubleday. 
 Cudjoe, Selwyn (1984). "Maya Angelou and the Autobiographical Statement". In Black Women Writers (1950–1980): A Critical Evaluation, Mari Evans, ed. Garden City, N.Y: Doubleday . 
 Cullinan, Bernice E. & Diane Goetz Person, eds. "Angelou, Maya". In  The Continuum Encyclopedia of Children's Literature. Continuum International Publishing Group (2003). .
 Foerstel, Herbert N. (2002). Banned in the U.S.: A Reference Guide to Book Censorship in Schools and Public Libraries.  Westport, Connecticut: Greenwood Press.  
 Gillespie, Marcia Ann, Rosa Johnson Butler, and Richard A. Long (2008). Maya Angelou: A Glorious Celebration. New York: Random House. 
 Hagen, Lyman B. (1997). Heart of a Woman, Mind of a Writer, and Soul of a Poet: A Critical Analysis of the Writings of Maya Angelou.  Lanham, Maryland: University Press. 
 King, Debra Walker (1998). Deep Talk: Reading African American Literary Names. Charlottesville, VA: University Press of Virginia.  
 Lauret, Maria (1994). Liberating Literature: Feminist Fiction in America. New York: Routledge. 
 Lupton, Mary Jane (1998). Maya Angelou: A Critical Companion. Westport, CT: Greenwood Press. 
 McPherson, Dolly A. (1990). Order out of Chaos: The Autobiographical Works of Maya Angelou. New York: Peter Lang Publishing. 
 Walker, Pierre A. (October 1995). "Racial Protest, Identity, Words, and Form in Maya Angelou's I Know Why the Caged Bird Sings".  In Bloom's Modern Critical Views: Maya Angelou.  New York: Infobase Publishing, 2009.  

1969 American novels
African-American autobiographies
American autobiographical novels
American bildungsromans
Books adapted into films
Random House books
Books by Maya Angelou
Censored books